Borrichia peruviana is a Peruvian species of flowering plants in the family Asteraceae. It is a perennial herb up to 150 cm (60 inches) tall. Flower heads are yellow, with both disc florets and ray florets.

References

Heliantheae
Flora of Peru
Plants described in 1785